The North Carolina Senate is the upper chamber of the North Carolina General Assembly, which along with the North Carolina House of Representatives—the lower chamber—comprises the state legislature of North Carolina. The term of office for each senator is only two years.

The Senate's prerogatives and powers are similar to those of the other house, the House of Representatives. Its members do, however, represent districts that are larger than those of their colleagues in the House. The President of the Senate is the Lieutenant Governor of North Carolina, but the Lt. Governor has very limited powers and only votes to break a tie. Before the office of Lt. Governor was created in 1868, the Senate was presided over by a "Speaker." After the 1988 election of James Carson Gardner, the first Republican Lt. Governor since Reconstruction, Democrats in control of the Senate shifted most of the power held by the Lt. Governor to the senator who is elected President Pro Tempore (or Pro-Tem). The President Pro Tempore appoints members to standing committees of the Senate, and holds great sway over bills.

According to the state constitution, the Senate is also the "Court for the Trial of Impeachments". The House of Representatives has the power to impeach state officials, after which the Senate holds an impeachment trial, as in the federal system. If the Governor or Lt. Governor is the official who has been impeached, the Chief Justice of the North Carolina Supreme Court presides.

Qualifications
The qualifications to be a senator are found in the state Constitution: "Each Senator, at the time of his election, shall be not less than 25 years of age, shall be a qualified voter of the State, and shall have resided in the State as a citizen for two years and in the district for which he is chosen for one year immediately preceding his election."

2023–24 composition

Leadership

Membership

↑: Member was originally appointed to fill the remainder of an unexpired term.

Past composition of the Senate

See also
North Carolina House of Representatives
 List of North Carolina state legislatures

References

External links
 
 Project Vote Smart – State Senate of North Carolina

 
State upper houses in the United States